Bradley Scott (born 22 June 1989) is a retired English mixed martial artist who competed in the Welterweight division of the Ultimate Fighting Championship. A professional competitor since 2009, he has also competed for Cage Warriors and was a contestant  The Ultimate Fighter: The Smashes.

Mixed martial arts career
Scott started his MMA career in 2007 training to become fit and in shape to be a part of the Royal Marines. However, Scott began taking the sport more seriously, even taking a semi-professional fight in his first year of training. Scott lost his only semi-pro fight via submission. Nearly a year and a half later, Scott made his professional debut against Tom Thorneycroft. Scott won the fight via first-round knockout.

In September 2009 Scott won his second pro fight against Steve Obe, again via knockout. One month later Scott had his first professional loss against Eugene Fadiora, after Scott submitted via strikes. Scott went on a 6-0 run after his first loss, winning all six fights via stoppage (3 submissions, 3 knockouts).

The Ultimate Fighter
In late 2012, Scott signed to be a competitor on The Ultimate Fighter: The Smashes - a regional version of the Ultimate Fighter series, which pitted Australian fighters against British fighters. In his first fight on the show, Scott fought Australian, Xavier Lucas. After a close fight, Scott defeated Lucas via unanimous decision.

For the semi-final rounds Scott was then matched against Australian, Benny Alloway. After three grueling rounds Scott won the fight via split decision. The fight was also awarded "Fight of the Season" by the UFC fans, and both fighters were awarded a $25,000 paycheck.

The win over Alloway moved Scott into the final round of the competition that took place live on UFC on FX: Sotiropoulos vs. Pearson. He faced Robert Whittaker and lost via unanimous decision.

Ultimate Fighting Championship
Scott made his promotional debut on 15 December 2012 at UFC on FX 6 which was also known as "The Ultimate Fighter: The Smashes Finale". He would fight Robert Whittaker to determine the welterweight winner of The Ultimate Fighter: The Smashes. Scott lost the fight via unanimous decision.

Scott returned to the middleweight division on 26 October 2013 against Michael Kuiper at UFC Fight Night 30. He won the fight via front choke submission in the first round.

Scott faced promotional newcomer Cláudio Silva at UFC Fight Night 37. He lost the back-and-forth fight via unanimous decision.

Scott faced Dylan Andrews on 10 May 2015 at UFC Fight Night 65. Scott won the fight via submission in the second round.

Scott faced Krzysztof Jotko on 27 February 2016 at UFC Fight Night 84. He lost the fight by unanimous decision.

Scott faced Scott Askham on 18 March 2017 at UFC Fight Night 107. He won the fight by split decision.

Scott faced Jack Hermansson on 5 August 2017 at UFC Fight Night 114. He lost the fight via TKO in the first round.

Scott was expected to face Jack Marshman on 17 March 2018 at UFC Fight Night 127. However, Marshman was removed from the card two days before the event for medical issues surrounding his weight cut and his fight with Scott was scrapped.

Scott was scheduled to face Salim Touahri on 27 May 2018 at UFC Fight Night 130. However, Touahri pulled out of the fight in mid-May citing a knee injury. He was replaced by promotional newcomer Carlo Pedersoli Jr. Scott lost the fight via split decision.

On 3 July 2018 UFC was notified by the U.S. Anti-Doping Agency (USADA) Scott of a potential Anti-Doping Policy violation stemming from an in-competition sample collected on 27 May 2018. On 16 October 2018 it was reported that Scott tested positive for benzoylecgonine, a metabolite of cocaine and USADA handed down a two-year suspension for his violation.

Sometime after his suspension, he retired from MMA.

Championships and accomplishments
Ultimate Fighting Championship
The Ultimate Fighter: The Smashes Welterweight Tournament Runner-Up
The Ultimate Fighter: The Smashes Fight of the Season (vs. Benny Alloway)

Mixed martial arts record

|-
|Loss
|align=center|11–6
|Carlo Pedersoli Jr.
|Decision (split)
|UFC Fight Night: Thompson vs. Till 
|
|align=center|3
|align=center|5:00
|Liverpool, England
|
|-
|Loss
|align=center|11–5
|Jack Hermansson
|TKO (punches)
|UFC Fight Night: Pettis vs. Moreno
|
|align=center|1
|align=center|3:50
|Mexico City, Mexico
|
|-
|Win
|align=center|11–4
|Scott Askham
|Decision (split)
|UFC Fight Night: Manuwa vs. Anderson
|
|align=center|3
|align=center|5:00
|London, England
|
|-
|Loss
|align=center|10–4
|Krzysztof Jotko
|Decision (unanimous)
|UFC Fight Night: Silva vs. Bisping
|
|align=center|3
|align=center|5:00
|London, England
| 
|-
|Win
|align=center| 10–3
|Dylan Andrews
|Submission (guillotine choke) 
|UFC Fight Night: Miocic vs. Hunt
|
|align=center|2
|align=center|4:54
|Adelaide, Australia
|
|-
|Loss
|align=center|9–3
|Cláudio Silva
|Decision (unanimous)
|UFC Fight Night: Gustafsson vs. Manuwa
|
|align=center|3
|align=center|5:00
|London, England
|
|-
|Win
|align=center|9–2
|Michael Kuiper
|Submission (standing guillotine choke)
|UFC Fight Night: Machida vs. Munoz
|
|align=center|1
|align=center|4:17
|Manchester, England
|
|-
|Loss
|align=center|8–2
|Robert Whittaker
|Decision (unanimous)
|UFC on FX: Sotiropoulos vs. Pearson
|
|align=center|3
|align=center|5:00
|Gold Coast, Australia
|
|-
|Win
|align=center|8–1
|Mok Rahman
|TKO (punches)
|Cage Warriors Fight Night 4
|
|align=center|3
|align=center|2:45
|Dubai, United Arab Emirates
|
|-
|Win
|align=center|7–1
|Gareth Williams
|Submission (rear-naked choke)
|Shock n Awe 8
|
|align=center|1
|align=center|3:16
|Portsmouth, England
|Welterweight debut.
|-
|Win
|align=center|6–1
|David Round
|Submission (rear-naked choke)
|Spartan Fight Challenge 4
|
|align=center|1
|align=center|N/A
|Nailsea, England
|
|-
|Win
|align=center|5–1
|Richard Weatherall
|TKO (punches)
|Spartan Fight Challenge 4
|
|align=center|1
|align=center|N/A
|Nailsea, England
|
|-
|Win
|align=center|4–1
|Glen Hubbard
|KO (punches)
|KUMMA: The New Breed 2
|
|align=center|2
|align=center|3:39
|Bath, England
|
|-
|Win
|align=center|3–1
|Rocci Williams
|Submission (rear-naked choke)
|Pro Kumite
|
|align=center|1
|align=center|2:20
|Croydon, England
|
|-
|Loss
|align=center|2–1
|Eugene Fadiora
|Submission (punches)
|Spartan Fight Challenge 2
|
|align=center|2
|align=center|N/A
|Nailsea, England
|
|-
|Win
|align=center|2–0
|Steve Obe
|KO (punches)
|Pro Kumite
|
|align=center|2
|align=center|0:34
|Croydon, England
|
|-
|Win
|align=center|1–0
|Tom Thorneycroft
|KO (punches) 
|Pro Kumite
|
|align=center|1
|align=center|3:02
|Swindon, England
|

Mixed martial arts exhibition record

|-
| Win
| align=center| 2–0
| Benny Alloway
| Decision (split)
| The Ultimate Fighter: The Smashes
| 
| align=center| 3
| align=center| 5:00
| Australia
| 
|-
| Win
| align=center| 1–0
| Xavier Lucas
| Decision (unanimous)
| The Ultimate Fighter: The Smashes
| 
| align=center| 2
| align=center| 5:00
| Australia
|
|-

See also
 List of male mixed martial artists

Notes

External links
 
 

1989 births
Living people
Sportspeople from Bath, Somerset
English male mixed martial artists
Welterweight mixed martial artists
Middleweight mixed martial artists
Doping cases in mixed martial arts
Ultimate Fighting Championship male fighters